Learning to Cope with Cowardice is the debut album by British singer Mark Stewart, released in 1983 by On-U Sound Records.  It was released on CD in 1991 with bonus tracks, as a Director's Cut CD in 2006 by EMI with other bonus tracks and versions, and then in 2019 by Mute as a 2LP/2CD set, combining the original album with the bonus album The Lost Tapes.

Accolades 
The information regarding accolades attributed to Learning to Cope with Cowardice is taken from Acclaimed Music.

Track listing

Personnel 
Mark Stewart and the Maffia
Mark Stewart – vocals, production, art direction
Desmond "Fatfingers" Coke – keyboards
Charles "Eskimo" Fox – drums
Evar Wellington – bass guitar
Additional musicians and production
Anna Hurl – art direction
George Oban – bass guitar on "Liberty City" and "Jerusalem"
Nick Plytas – keyboards on "Liberty City" and "None Dare Call It Conspiracy"
Dan Sheals – drums on "Blessed Are Those Who Struggle"
Adrian Sherwood – production
Antonio "Crucial Tony" Phillips – bass guitar on "Blessed Are Those Who Struggle"

References

External links 
 

1983 debut albums
On-U Sound Records albums
Mark Stewart (English musician) albums
Albums produced by Adrian Sherwood